The origins of global surveillance can be traced back to the late 1940s, when the UKUSA Agreement was jointly enacted by the United Kingdom and the United States, whose close cooperation eventually culminated in the creation of the global surveillance network, code-named "ECHELON", in 1971.

In the aftermath of the 1970s Watergate affair and a subsequent congressional inquiry led by Senator Frank Church, it was revealed that the NSA, in collaboration with Britain's GCHQ, had routinely intercepted the international communications of prominent anti-Vietnam War leaders such as Jane Fonda and Benjamin Spock. Decades later, a multi-year investigation by the European Parliament highlighted the NSA's role in economic espionage in a report entitled "Development of Surveillance Technology and Risk of Abuse of Economic Information", in 1999.

However, for the general public, it was a series of detailed disclosures of internal NSA documents in June 2013 that first revealed the massive extent of the NSA's spying, both foreign and domestic. Most of these were leaked by an ex-contractor, Edward Snowden. Even so, a number of these older global surveillance programs such as PRISM, XKeyscore, and Tempora were referenced in the 2013 release of thousands of documents. As confirmed by the NSA's director Keith B. Alexander in 2013, the NSA collects and stores all phone records of all American citizens. Much of the data is kept in large storage facilities such as the Utah Data Center, a US$1.5 billion megaproject referred to by The Wall Street Journal as a "symbol of the spy agency's surveillance prowess."

Clandestine surveillance in the United States 

Wartime censorship of communications during the World Wars was paralleled by peacetime decipherment of communications by the Black Chamber (Cipher Bureau, MI-8), operating with the approval of the U.S. State Department from 1919 to 1929. In 1945 the now-defunct Project SHAMROCK was created to gather all telegraphic data entering into or exiting from the United States. Major communication companies such as Western Union, RCA Global and ITT World Communications actively aided the U.S. government in the latter's attempt to gain access to international message traffic.

In 1952, the NSA was officially established. According to The New York Times, the NSA was created in "absolute secrecy" by President Truman. Six weeks after President Truman took office, he ordered wiretaps on the telephones of Thomas Gardiner Corcoran, a close advisor of Franklin D. Roosevelt. The recorded conversations are currently kept at the Harry S. Truman Presidential Library and Museum, along with other sensitive documents (~233,600 pages).

Under J. Edgar Hoover, the Federal Bureau of Investigation (FBI) carried out wide-ranging surveillance of communications and political expression, targeting many well-known speakers such as Albert Einstein, Frank Sinatra, First Lady Eleanor Roosevelt, Marilyn Monroe, John Lennon, and Daniel Ellsberg, Through the illegal COINTELPRO project, Hoover placed emphasis on civil rights movement leader Martin Luther King Jr. (amongst others), with one FBI memo calling King the "most dangerous and effective Negro leader in the country." 

Some of these activities were uncovered when documents were released in 1971 by the Citizens' Commission to Investigate the FBI, followed by the information revealed in the investigations of the 1972 Watergate scandal. Following the 1974 resignation of Richard Nixon, and in light of the cumulative revelations, the U.S. Senate Church Committee was appointed in 1975 to investigate intelligence abuses by federal agencies. In a May 1976 Time article, Nobody Asked: Is It Moral?, the magazine stated:

Mass surveillance in a global context (1940–2001) 

During World War II the U.K. and U.S. governments entered into a series of agreements for sharing of signals intelligence of enemy communications traffic. In March 1946, a secret agreement, the "British-US Communication Intelligence Agreement", known as BRUSA, was established, based on the wartime agreements. The agreement "tied the two countries into a worldwide network of listening posts run by Government Communications Headquarters (GCHQ), the U.K.'s biggest spying organisation, and its U.S. equivalent, the National Security Agency."

In 1988, an article titled "Somebody's listening" by Duncan Campbell in the New Statesman, described the signals intelligence gathering activities of a program code-named "ECHELON. The program was engaged by English-speaking World War II Allied powers Australia, Canada, New Zealand, the United Kingdom and the United States (collectively known as AUSCANNZUKUS). Based on the UKUSA Agreement, it was created to monitor the military and diplomatic communications of the Soviet Union and its Eastern Bloc allies during the Cold War in the early 1960s. Though its existence had long been known, the UKUSA agreement only became public in 2010. It enabled the U.S. and the U.K. to exchange "knowledge from operations involving intercepting, decoding and translating foreign communications." The agreement forbade the parties to reveal its existence to any third party.

By the late 1990s the ECHELON system was capable of intercepting satellite transmissions, public switched telephone network (PSTN) communications (including most Internet traffic), and transmissions carried by microwave. A detailed description of ECHELON was provided by New Zealand journalist Nicky Hager in his 1996 book "Secret Power". While the existence of ECHELON was denied by some member governments, a report by a committee of the European Parliament in 2001 confirmed the program's use and warned Europeans about its reach and effects. The European Parliament stated in its report that the term "ECHELON" was used in a number of contexts, but that the evidence presented indicated it was a signals intelligence collection system capable of interception and content inspection of telephone calls, fax, e-mail and other data traffic globally. The report to the European Parliament confirmed that this was a "global system for the interception of private and commercial communications."

9/11 and its implications on global surveillance (2001–2009) 

In the aftermath of the September 11 attacks in 2001 on the World Trade Center and the Pentagon, the scope of domestic spying in the United States increased significantly. The bid to prevent future attacks of this scale led to the passage of the Patriot Act. Later acts include the Protect America Act (which removes the warrant requirement for government surveillance of foreign targets) and the FISA Amendments Act (which relaxed some of the original FISA court requirements).

In 2005, the existence of STELLARWIND was revealed by Thomas Tamm. On January 1, 2006, days after The New York Times wrote that "Bush Lets U.S. Spy on Callers Without Courts, the President emphasized that "This is a limited program designed to prevent attacks on the United States of America. And I repeat, limited."

In 2006, Mark Klein revealed the existence of Room 641A that he had wired back in 2003. In 2008, Babak Pasdar, a computer security expert, and CEO of Bat Blue publicly revealed the existence of the "Quantico circuit", that he and his team found in 2003. He described it as a back door to the federal government in the systems of an unnamed wireless provider; the company was later independently identified as Verizon. Additional disclosures regarding a mass surveillance program involving U.S. citizens had been made in the U.S. media in 2006.

Acceleration of media leaks (2010–present) 
On November 28, 2010, WikiLeaks and five major news outlets in Spain (El País), France (Le Monde), Germany (Der Spiegel), the United Kingdom (The Guardian), and the United States (The New York Times) began publishing the first 220 of 251,287 leaked U.S. State department diplomatic "cables" simultaneously.

On March 15, 2012, the American magazine Wired published an article with the headline "The NSA Is Building the Country's Biggest Spy Center (Watch What You Say)", which was later mentioned by U.S. Rep. Hank Johnson during a congressional hearing. In response to Johnson's inquiry, NSA director Keith B. Alexander testified that these allegations made by Wired magazine were untrue.

In early 2013, Edward Snowden handed over 200,000 top secret documents to various media outlets, triggering one of the biggest news leaks in the modern history of the United States.

See also 
 History of surveillance

References 

Global surveillance